William Garrud (1873–1960) was a British jujutsu instructor. Garrud was introduced to jujutsu in 1899 alongside his wife Edith. They studied under Japanese jujutsu masters Yukio Tani and Sadakazu Uyenishi and later opened their own London dojo. In 1914 Garrud, wrote The Complete Jujitsuan which became a standard work on jujitsu, judo and self-defence and has been republished at least seven times. During the war Garrud trained the Volunteer Civil Force in Jujitsu. Edith and William Garrud continued to work as instructors until 1925, when they retired.

Early life and training 
William H. Garrud was born in 1873. As a physical culture instructor, specialised in boxing and wrestling, Garrud travelled around the country teaching classes. In 1892 while giving a class in Bath, he met Edith Williams a fellow teacher of physical education. They married the following year, and moved to London where William found work as a physical culture trainer for universities. In 1900 they watched a Jujutsu demonstration at the Alhambra Theatre by Edward William Barton-Wright. The Garruds became students at Barton-Wright's training facility in Soho the Bartitsu School of Arms and Physical Culture, the first known Japanese martial arts' school in Europe. After the school closed in 1902 they continued training under Japanese jujutsu masters Yukio Tani and Sadakazu Uyenishi who opened the School of Japanese Self Defence at 31, Golden Square, Piccadilly Circus, London. While training at the Golden Square Dojo Garrud studied with the best instructors of the time including Taro Miyake, Mitsuyo Maeda, Gunji Koizumi and Akitaro Ohno.

When Uyenishi left for Japan in 1908 Garrud took over Uyenishi's dojo. Edith assisted her husband with the women's and children's classes. Edith Garrud was also an active suffragette and led the athletic branch of the Women's Freedom League. A year after taking over Uyenishi's dojo the Garruds divorced. They continued performing jujutsu on stage in music hall exhibitions and public demonstrations, where William dressed as a policeman, they also offered private instruction for members of the organisations for women's suffrage. Garrud, published The Complete Jujitsuan in 1914, dedicating it to "Professor S.K. Uyenishi "Raku". His book became a standard work on jujitsu, judo and self-defence and continued as such for decades, it has been republished at least seven times. At the outbreak of the First World War, being too old to serve Garrud joined the Volunteer Civil Force, the armed force of volunteer police officers, training its members for free in jujutsu.

Retirement and death 
William and Edith continued to run the Golden Square dojo as owners and instructors until 1925 when they retired from teaching. The Garruds had two children, a son Owen who was killed in the Second World War aged 24 and a daughter. William Garrud died in 1960 at the age of 87.

Gallery

Notes

References

Sources 
 
 
 
 
 
 
 
 

1873 births
1960 deaths
British martial artists
British jujutsuka
People associated with physical culture